The Old Soak is a 1926 American silent crime drama directed by Edward Sloman. The film stars Jean Hersholt, George J. Lewis, and June Marlowe, and is based on a 1922 Broadway play of the same title by Don Marquis. The play was later adapted into the 1937 release The Good Old Soak starring Wallace Beery.

The Old Soak is now presumed lost. However, a 16mm reduction positive print may exist in a private collection.

Cast
Jean Hersholt as Clement Hawley, Sr.
George J. Lewis as Clemmy Hawley
June Marlowe as Ina Heath
William V. Mong as Cousin Webster
Gertrude Astor as Sylvia De Costa
Louise Fazenda as Annie
Lucy Beaumont as Mrs. Hawley
Adda Gleason as Lucy
Tom Ricketts as Roue
George Siegmann as Al
Arnold Gray as Shelly Hawley (billed as Arnold Gregg)

See also
Gertrude Astor filmography

References

External links

 
 
 Original era lobby poster (Wayback Machine)
 Still from the film

1926 films
1926 crime drama films
American crime drama films
American silent feature films
American black-and-white films
American films based on plays
Films directed by Edward Sloman
Lost American films
Universal Pictures films
Adaptations of works by Don Marquis
1926 lost films
Lost drama films
1920s American films
Silent American drama films
1920s English-language films